Bill Carrick (born 23 November 1934) is  a former Australian rules footballer who played with Richmond in the Victorian Football League (VFL).

A full-forward, Carrick only played 5 games in his three seasons at Richmond, but did play in Richmond's 1955 Reserves' Premiership team. He later played for the Ballarat and Box Hill Football Clubs.

Notes

External links 
		

Living people
1934 births
Australian rules footballers from Victoria (Australia)
Richmond Football Club players
Ballarat Football Club players
Box Hill Football Club players